The Climate Change (Scotland) Act 2009 is an Act of the Scottish Parliament. The Act includes an emissions target, set for the year 2050, for a reduction of at least 80% from the baseline year, 1990. Annual targets for greenhouse gas emissions must also be set, after consultation the relevant advisory bodies.

Provisions are included in the Act for the creation of a Scottish Committee on Climate Change, as at present the only advisory body is the UK-wide Committee on Climate Change. Ministers in parliament must now report on the progress of these targets. As of January 2011, public sector bodies in Scotland must comply with new guidelines set out by the Scottish Government.

Role in the formation of the first Scottish National Party government
In May 2007 the Scottish Green Party supported Alex Salmond's first election as First Minister, and his subsequent appointments of ministers, in return for early tabling of the climate change bill and the SNP nominating a Green MSP to chair a parliamentary committee.

History
The government consulted on the legislation and received more than 21,000 responses. The bill was announced in December 2008.

Parliamentary passage
The Bill was passed unanimously by the Scottish Parliament on 24 June 2009 and received royal assent on 4 August.

Secondary legislation
Eight pieces of secondary legislation have been made under the Act:
 Climate Change (Scotland) Act 2009 (Commencement No. 1) Order 2009
 Carbon Accounting Scheme (Scotland) Regulations 2010
 Climate Change (Limit on Carbon Units) (Scotland) Order 2010, for the period 2010–2012, includes a specification that certain carbon units associated with the European Union Emission Trading Scheme do not count towards the limit for that period
 Climate Change (International Aviation and Shipping) (Scotland) Order 2010, describes the method for calculating emissions of greenhouse gases from international aviation and shipping that are attributable to Scotland
 Climate Change (Annual Targets) (Scotland) Order 2010, for the period 2010-2022
 Waste Information (Scotland) Regulations 2010, introduce a statutory obligation on bodies to provide the Scottish Environmental Protection Agency with data upon request
 Climate Change (Annual Targets) (Scotland) Order 2011, for the period 2023-2027
 Climate Change (Limit on Carbon Units) (Scotland) Order 2011
 Climate Change (Emissions Reduction Targets) (Scotland) Act 2019

See also
 Climate change in Scotland
 Environment of Scotland
 List of Acts of the Scottish Parliament from 1999

References

External links
 Climate Change (Scotland) Act 2009 at the Scottish Government website

2009 in the environment
Acts of the Scottish Parliament 2009
Climate change in Scotland
Climate change law
Climate change policy in the United Kingdom
Emissions reduction
Environmental law in the United Kingdom